John Milton Thayer (January 24, 1820March 19, 1906) was a general in the Union Army during the American Civil War and a postbellum United States Senator from Nebraska. Thayer served as Governor of Wyoming Territory and Governor of Nebraska.

Thayer was born in Bellingham, Norfolk County, Massachusetts. He attended and taught in rural schools. He graduated from Brown University in 1841, and established a practice in Worcester, Massachusetts. Thayer was the editor of the Worcester Magazine and the Historical Journal. Thayer served as a lieutenant in the local militia company before deciding to move with his family to the West. He was married to Mary Torrey Allen on December 27, 1842, and they had six children.

Career
Arriving in Nebraska in 1854, he quickly affiliated himself with the Republican Party and actively participated in politics, as well as owning a large farm near Omaha.

In 1855 he was appointed major general of the Territorial Militia. In June of the same year, at the direction of Acting Nebraska Territorial Governor Thomas B. Cuming, Thayer led a council with Pawnee chiefs near present-day Leshara, Nebraska. The chiefs were led by Pitalesharo, the town's namesake. Local Pawnee had conducted a series of raids on local settlers and Thayer meant to calm the situation. The general gained a reputation as an Indian fighter throughout the 1850s, eventually culminating with the Pawnee War of 1859.

Thayer served as delegate to the 1860 State Constitution Convention which organized the Republican Party in the Nebraska Territory. He  was elected to the Nebraska Territorial Legislature in 1860.

Civil War
With the outbreak of the Civil War, Thayer wrote a letter to Secretary of War Simon Cameron asking that he be allowed to raise a Nebraska regiment in response to President Abraham Lincoln's call for volunteers. He resigned his legislative seat in June 1861 to become Colonel of the 1st Nebraska Infantry Regiment, and spent the entire war fighting in the Western Theater. He commanded a brigade under Lew Wallace in the battles of Fort Donelson, Shiloh and Siege of Corinth. Promoted to brigadier general in October 1862, he led a brigade in the XV Corps.  He saw action at the battles of Chickasaw Bayou and Fort Hindman and the siege of Vicksburg.

Thayer was then assigned to the cavalry and commanded the District of the Frontier with his headquarters in Fort Smith, Arkansas. He participated in the Camden Expedition and other actions in the region, seeing considerable action at the Battle of Prairie D'Ane.  He commanded the rearguard of Frederick Steele's force at the Battle of Jenkins' Ferry, battling Confederate troops under Sterling Price for over four hours before forcing Price to disengage. His delaying action enabled Steele to successfully extricate his army to safety.

In February 1865, Thayer was relieved of command of Fort Smith and sent to the smaller post at St. Charles, Arkansas, with a regiment of Kansas cavalry and a single artillery battery. However, with the omnibus promotions of leading generals at the close of the war, Thayer was brevetted major general of volunteers in 1865.

Postbellum career
After the Civil War, Thayer served as a member of the 1866 State Constitutional Convention. Upon the admission of Nebraska into the Union as a state, he was elected as one of its first two United States senators. He served as a member of the Senate from 1867 to 1871, when he was unsuccessful in winning reelection.

President Ulysses S. Grant appointed Thayer Governor of the Territory of Wyoming in February 1875 and he took the oath of office March 1, 1875. His service ended on May 29, 1878, and he returned to Nebraska to resume his law practice.

In 1886, Thayer secured the Republican gubernatorial nomination and was elected Governor of Nebraska by popular vote. He served two full terms as Governor of Nebraska, from 1886 to 1888. He was the seventh governor of Nebraska.

Thayer served part of a third term, (May 5, 1891February 8, 1892).  He contested the results of the 1890 election, in which he lost to James E. Boyd; Boyd was initially installed as governor, but Thayer again became governor until the election was ruled in favor of Boyd.  He then retired from public life to follow literary pursuits.

Death and legacy
John M. Thayer died in Lincoln, Nebraska, and was buried in Wyuka Cemetery in Lincoln, Nebraska.

Thayer County, Nebraska, is named for Thayer. A bust of Thayer is located on the grounds of the Vicksburg National Military Park in Mississippi. The bust was erected in May 1915 and was sculpted by T.A.R. Kitson.

See also

List of American Civil War generals (Union)

References

Further reading
 American National Biography
 Dictionary of American Biography
 Curtis, Earl G. John Milton Thayer Nebraska History 29 (March/June 1948): 134-50.
 Warner, Ezra J., Generals in Blue: Lives of the Union Commanders. Baton Rouge: Louisiana State University Press, 1964, .

External links

 Retrieved on February 12, 2008
John Milton Thayer at RootsWeb.com
 at the Nebraska State Historical Society

The Encyclopedia of Nebraska
National Park Service

1820 births
1906 deaths
People from Bellingham, Massachusetts
American people of English descent
Republican Party United States senators from Nebraska
Republican Party governors of Nebraska
Wyoming Republicans
Governors of Wyoming Territory
Members of the Nebraska Territorial Legislature
19th-century American politicians
Brown University alumni
People of Nebraska in the American Civil War
Union Army generals
Military personnel from Massachusetts